Škrda, or Otok Škrda, is an uninhabited Croatian island in the Adriatic Sea with an area of 2.05 km2, and 7.177 km of coastline, located southwest of Pag. British escort destroyer  was sunk by a naval mine near the island in December 1944.

References

External links
 Škrda description
  

Uninhabited islands of Croatia
Islands of the Adriatic Sea
Landforms of Zadar County